Ailell mac Inreachtach, 27th King of Uí Maine, died 791/799.

Ailell was the son of king Inreachtach mac Dluthach. No other details appear of him.

Notes

References

Annals of Ulster at CELT: Corpus of Electronic Texts at University College Cork
Annals of Tigernach at CELT: Corpus of Electronic Texts at University College Cork
Revised edition of McCarthy's synchronisms at Trinity College Dublin.
Byrne, Francis John (2001), Irish Kings and High-Kings, Dublin: Four Courts Press,

External links
Commentary by Dan M. Wiley (The Cycles of the Kings Web Project)

People from County Galway
People from County Roscommon
790s deaths
8th-century Irish monarchs
Year of birth unknown
Kings of Uí Maine